Toyah! Toyah! Toyah! is a greatest hits compilation album by the English new wave band Toyah, fronted by Toyah Willcox, released in 1984 by K-tel. The album is also known as Toyah! Toyah! Toyah! All the Hits by including the cover slogan to differentiate it from the earlier live album Toyah! Toyah! Toyah!.

Background
It was the band's first compilation album to date and covered material from the Sheep Farming in Barnet era through to 1983's Love Is The Law. It consisted of most of Toyah's singles, including all charting singles, as well as non-single tracks. The rare song "Sphinx" was previously only available as a flexi disc included with issue 8 of Flexipop magazine in 1981. The compilation marked the first time that "Good Morning Universe", "Thunder in the Mountains", "Sphinx" and "Be Proud Be Loud (Be Heard)" were included on a full-length album. The record sleeve was designed by Bill Smith. A companion VHS videocassette was also released containing four music videos and a live performance. The album was a moderate chart success in the UK.

Track listing
Side one
 "I Want to Be Free" (Toyah Willcox, Joel Bogen) – 3:06
 "Good Morning Universe" (Willcox, Bogen) – 3:27
 "Rebel Run" (Willcox, Simon Darlow) – 3:10
 "Angels and Demons" (Willcox, Keith Hale) – 6:15
 "We Are" (Willcox, Bogen) – 3:08
 "Race Through Space" (Willcox, Bogen, Peter Bush) – 3:10
 "The Angel and Me" (Willcox, Bogen) – 4:31
 "Thunder in the Mountains" (Willcox, Adrian Lee, Nigel Glockler) – 3:36

Side two

"It's a Mystery" (Hale) – 4:00
"Brave New World" (Willcox, Bogen) – 3:30
"Neon Womb" (Willcox, Bogen, Bush) – 3:49
"Sphinx" (Willcox, Bogen) – 3:11
"Be Proud Be Loud (Be Heard)" (Willcox, Bogen) – 3:20
"The Vow" (Willcox, Bogen, Phil Spalding) – 3:44
"Danced" (Willcox, Bogen, Bush) – 5:06
"Ieya" (New Version) (Willcox, Bogen, Bush) – 3:34

Personnel
 Toyah Willcox – vocals
 Joel Bogen – guitar
 Phil Spalding – bass
 Brad Lang – bass
 Mark Henry – bass
 Peter Bush – keyboards
 Adrian Lee – keyboards
 Simon Darlow – keyboards
 Steve Bray – drums
 Nigel Glockler – drums
 Simon Phillips – drums
 Andy Duncan – drums

Charts

References

1984 compilation albums
Toyah (band) albums
K-tel compilation albums